Haimen is a county-level city of Jiangsu, China.

Haimen may also refer to:

 Jiaojiang District, formerly Haimen
 Haimen goat
 Haimen, Guangdong, town in Shantou
 Haimen Town, Jiangsu, seat of Haimen city